The Hong Kong version of Are You Smarter than a 5th Grader? (Traditional Chinese: 係咪小兒科, literally translated "is it child's play?") was produced by TVB from 2008 to 2009. This show was based on the American show of the same name. It is hosted by Leo Ku and narrated by Kevin So.

The first season started on 25 October 2008 and ended on 25 April 2009. The second season aired between 5 October 2009 and 16 November 2009.

Format
The format is based on the original 2007-09 United States version (not the level-based format adopted when the show switched to syndication).

The 3 "cheats" are called "參考隔籬" (Peek), "搬字過紙" (Copy) and "自動補答" (Save) respectively.

The question values are also the same as the American version, but in Hong Kong Dollars. The top prize, HK$1,000,000, is about US$129,000.

The subjects of the questions are:
Chinese
English
Mathematics
General Studies
Putonghua
Science
Music
Visual Arts
Computer
Physical Education

However, unlike other versions, at the start of every episode, the host will ask an IQ question, which is just for fun, the answer will be announced at the end of that episode.

List of contestants
All the contestants are celebrities. "Drop out" means the contestant quits in the middle of the game, "Flunk out" means the contestant answers the question incorrectly.

Season 1

Season 2

Criticism
Since the "classmates" of every episode almost got all the questions correctly, many audience thought that they memorized all the answers already before the recording of the show. Some audience may even think that the actual purpose of the show is to bring out the message that children are smarter than adults. Memorizing like that convinced some people they cheated via sophisticated state-of-the-art gadgets, this included "telephoning" individualistic thoughts, pre-recorded hidden textual dialogues and even secrecy in transfer quixotic answers.

References

External links
Official website

Chinese game shows
Are You Smarter than a 5th Grader?

zh:係咪小兒科